Union Township is a township in Story County, Iowa. At the time of the 2000 census, its population was 1,253.

Geography
According to the United States Geological Survey, it contains one cemetery: the Cambridge Cemetery.

 Interstate 35 runs north and south through the township. County Road E29 and Iowa Hwy 210 runs east–west.

The Skunk River flows from the northwest to the southeast through the township.

Story County maintains the Askew Bridge/Cambridge Pond recreational site at the intersection of 290th Street and R70. This  borrow pit site contains a  pond surrounded by native vegetation. Along with hunting and fishing, this area provides a Skunk River Water Trail Canoe Access.

The county also maintains the Christiansen Forest Preserve at 55973 310th Street. It is a  wooded tract at the western edge of the township, continuing into Palestine Township. It was donated to the conservation board in 1985 by Charles Christiansen and is designated as a wildlife refuge (no hunting is allowed). The preserve offers hiking, off-road biking, and bluebird trails. Equestrians are not allowed at the preserve. There is a replica of a colonial-times cabin built by Ballard school students.

Union Township is adjacent to Indian Creek, Grant and Palestine townships.

External links
 US-Counties.com
 City-Data.com

Townships in Story County, Iowa
Townships in Iowa